Mind Blowing or Mind Blowin' may refer to:

Music
Mind Blowin', a 1994 album by Vanilla Ice

Songs
"Mind Blowin (Smooth song), 1995
"Mind Blowin (The D.O.C. song), 1989
"Mind Blowin, a song by The Brat from Funkdafied
"Mind Blowin, a song by Grits from Dichotomy A, 2004
"Mind Blowin, a song by Ghetto Twiinz from In That Water
"Mind Blowin, a song by  N'dambi from Pink Elephant 2009

See also
"Mind Blowing Decisions", a song by Heatwave from Central Heating 1978